Sarita सरिता is a fortnightly Hindi magazine published by the Delhi Press Group. The magazine was first published in 1945. The magazine targets women, and embodies the ideology of social and familial reconstruction. In the 1950s it was published on a monthly basis.

References

External links

Hindi-language magazines
Biweekly magazines published in India
Monthly magazines published in India
Women's magazines published in India
Magazines established in 1945